Limchungbung (earlier:Sunkoshi) is a rural municipality in Udayapur district of Province No. 1 in Nepal. There are 4 rural municipalities in Udayapur district. There are 5 wards in this municipality. According to 2011 census of Nepal, the total population of the municipality is 11,992 and total area is 106.8  km². The headquarter of the municipality is in Baraha

The rural municipality was established on March 10, 2017 when Ministry of Federal Affairs and Local Development dissolved the existing village development committees and announced the establishment of this new local body.

Basabote, Tamlichha, Baraha, Balamta and Jante VDCs were merged to form the new rural municipality.

See also
 Udayapurgadhi Rural Municipality
 Rautamai Rural Municipality
 Tapli Rural Municipality

External links
 limchungbungmun.gov.np

References

 
Rural municipalities in Koshi Province
Rural municipalities in Udayapur district
Rural municipalities of Nepal established in 2017